Conrad I ( – 8 January 1152) was Duke of Zähringen from 1122 until his death and from 1127 also Rector of Burgundy.  He spent most of his life stemming the growing power of the House of Hohenstaufen and to this end, allied himself with the House of Guelph.

Life 
Conrad I was a son of Duke Berthold II and his wife, Agnes of Rheinfelden.  In 1120, Conrad I and his elder brother Berthold III granted city rights to Freiburg. In 1122, Conrad I succeeded Berthold III as Duke of Zähringen.

In 1127, he came into conflict with Count Reginald III of Burgundy, because both men claimed the inheritance of Conrad's murdered nephew William III.  In this situation, he benefitted from the situation Emperor Lothar III found himself in.  Lothar urgently needed support against his Hohenstaufen rivals, and he supported Conrad's claim.  He rejected Reginald's claim, with the dubious argument that Reginald had failed to comply with his duty to attend the emperor's court.  Conrad received the title rector of Burgundy, which denoted, as least theoretically, a kind of representative of the emperor in the Kingdom of Burgundy.

In 1138, King Conrad III of Germany grabbed power and the power conflict between the Guelphs and the Hohenstaufen relaxed.  Until the late 1150s, the dukes of Zähringen were among the Hohenstaufen's most loyal supporters.

Conrad I died in 1152 in Constance and was buried in the family vault in the Abbey of Saint Peter in the Black Forest.

Marriage and issue 
Conrad was married to Clementia of Namur, daughter of Godfrey I, Count of Namur and had at least five children:
 Berthold IV, duke of Zähringen
 Adalbert I, founder of the line Dukes of Teck
 Clementia, married Henry the Lion
 Rudolf, Archbishop of Mainz
 Hugh, Duke of Ullenburg

Notes

References

Sources

 Eberhard Holz and Wolfgang Huschner (eds.): Deutsche Fürsten des Mittelalters, Edition Leipzig, Leipzig, 1995, 
 

Dukes of Zähringen
1090s births
Year of birth unknown
1152 deaths
Wendish Crusade